The 1990 Great American Bank Classic was a women's tennis tournament played on outdoor hard courts in San Diego, California, United States, that was part of the Tier III category of the 1991 WTA Tour. It was the 13th edition of the tournament and was held from August 6 through August 12, 1990. First-seeded Steffi Graf won the singles title.

Finals

Singles
 Steffi Graf defeated  Manuela Maleeva-Fragnière 6–3, 6–2.
 It was Graf's 6th singles title of the year and the 50th of her career.

Doubles
 Patty Fendick /  Zina Garrison defeated  Elise Burgin /  Rosalyn Fairbank-Nideffer 6–4, 7–6(7–5).

References

External links
 ITF tournament edition details
 Tournament draws

Mazda Classic
Southern California Open
Toshiba Classic
1990 in American tennis